David Taylor (born 2 May 1881, date of death unknown) was an Australian cricketer. He played one first-class match for New South Wales in 1907/08.

See also
 List of New South Wales representative cricketers

References

External links
 

1881 births
Year of death missing
Australian cricketers
New South Wales cricketers
Cricketers from Sydney